Baryancistrus niveatus is a species of catfish in the family Loricariidae. It is native to South America, where it occurs in the basins of the Xingu River, the Tapajós, the Trombetas River, and the Tocantins River in Brazil. This species is the among the largest members of the genus Baryancistrus, reaching 34 cm (13.4 inches) in total length. It sometimes appears in the aquarium trade, where it is known by its L-number, L-026.

References 

Fish described in 1855
Catfish of South America
Loricariidae